Pilar del Castillo Vera (Nador, Morocco, 31 July 1952) is a Spanish politician who has been serving as a Member of the European Parliament since 2004. She previously served as Minister for Education, Culture and Sport in the government of Prime Minister José María Aznar from 2000 to 2004.

Early life and education
Law graduate at Complutense University of Madrid, 1974. In 1980 she was granted a Fulbright Scholarship for a master's degree in political science at Ohio State University, United States. PhD in law from Complutense University of Madrid, 1983. Awarded the Spanish Sociological Research Centre Prize for the doctoral thesis 'Political Party Funding in Western Democracies', 1984.

Career
In 1986, Del Castillo became assistant professor in constitutional law at UNED, and professor in political science and administration in 1994. Editor-in-chief of the Journal Nueva Revista de Política, Cultura y Arte, 1995–1996. Director of the Spanish Sociological Research Centre, 1996 to 2000. She is author of numerous publications on political parties and electoral behaviour.

Political career

Minister of Education, Culture and Sport, 2000–2004
When Prime Minister José Maria Aznar led his conservative Popular Party to a victory and second term of office at the 2000 national elections, he made Del Castillo his new Minister of Education, Culture and Sport. In this capacity, she was in charge of implementing the government's 2001 plan to overhaul the country's public universities; the law prompted the largest student demonstrations since Spain's transition to democracy, with an estimated 100,000 students, university staff protesting nationwide on 1 December 2001.

Member of the European Parliament, 2004–present
Del Castillo has been a Member of the European Parliament since the 2004 European elections. She has since been serving as coordinator for the Group of the European People's Party in the Committee on Industry, Research and Energy (ITRE), and as substitute member in the Committee on Economic and Monetary Affairs (ECON). From 2007 to 2009, she was a member of the Temporary Committee on Climate Change. In addition, she was a member of the EP Delegation for Relations with India (2009–2014) and of the Delegation for relations with the People's Republic of China (2004–2009). She represented the Parliament at the 2008 United Nations Climate Change Conference in Poznań and the 2009 United Nations Climate Change Conference in Copenhagen. In 2020, she also joined the Special Committee on Artificial Intelligence in a Digital Age.

In her capacity as member of the Committee on Industry, Research and Energy, Del Castillo is the parliament's rapporteur on the European Union’s Data Act. She also served as rapporteur on the Directive on Security of Networks and Information Systems (NIS); the Regulation on the Body of European Regulators in Electronic Communications (BEREC); on the Cloud Computing Strategy for Europe; and on a telecoms single market.

In addition to her committee assignments, Del Castillo holds the following positions in the European Parliament:
 European Energy Forum (EEF), member
 European Internet Foundation, chairwoman
 European Parliament Intergroup on Disability, member
 Transatlantic Policy Network (TPN), member
 Knowledge4Innovation (K4I), member of the board

Other activities (selection)
 European Ideas Network (EIN), chair of the 'Energy and Environment' Permanent Working Group
 European Network for Women in Leadership (WIL), member
 Spanish Foundation for Social Studies and Analysis (FAES), member of the board of trustees
 Prado Museum, member of the board of trustees
 Fundación Botín, member of the advisory board
 Fundación Ortega-Marañón, member of the board of trustees

Personal life
Del Castillo is passionate about art; her official ministerial portrait in the gallery of the Ministry of Education is a self-portrait.

References

External links

 Pilar del Castillo's personal page
 Pilar del Castillo's Twitter Profile
 Pilar del Castillo's Facebook Page
 

1952 births
Living people
Members of the 8th Congress of Deputies (Spain)
MEPs for Spain 2004–2009
MEPs for Spain 2009–2014
MEPs for Spain 2014–2019
MEPs for Spain 2019–2024
21st-century women MEPs for Spain
People's Party (Spain) MEPs
Recipients of the Civil Order of Alfonso X, the Wise
Women government ministers of Spain
Culture ministers of Spain
Academic staff of the National University of Distance Education
Fulbright alumni